The Yuan Dadu City Wall Ruins Park, also known as the Tucheng or Earth Wall Park, is an urban park and historic site in Beijing. The park was created in 1988 to preserve the ruins of the northern city wall of Khanbaliq (Dadu), capital of the Mongol-led Yuan dynasty. The city wall was constructed in 1267 and finished in 1276. It was abandoned in the Ming dynasty when Beijing was rebuilt and slightly shifted to the south. The northern segment of the city wall is preserved, and a narrow and long park was created around the ruin of the city wall in Haidian District and Chaoyang District. It runs in between and parallel to the northern sections of the 3rd and 4th Ring Roads. The park underwent restoration in 2003.

References

Parks in Beijing
Archaeological parks
Yuan dynasty architecture
City walls in China
2003 establishments in China